Alam Chak is a village in the rural Mansurchak Block of Begusarai district in Bihar, India. The village's block headquarter town is Mansurchak.

Geography
The geographical coordinates i.e. latitude and longitude of Alam Chak is 25.6328 and 85.8953 respectively.

References 

Begusarai district
Villages in Begusarai district